Catherine Elizabeth Maples  Waynick (born November 13, 1948) is an American Anglican bishop. She was the 10th bishop of the Episcopal Diocese of Indianapolis from 1997 to 2017. She was elected bishop coadjutor of the Episcopal Diocese of Indianapolis in January 1997, was consecrated on June 7 of that year, and became the diocesan bishop on September 10, 1997. She succeeded Edward W. Jones, who served from 1977 to 1997. At the 2015 diocesan convention, Waynick announced plans to retire, and called for the election of a new bishop to be consecrated in 2017. She was succeeded by Jennifer Baskerville-Burrows on April 29, 2017. Waynick was called to serve as provisional bishop for the Episcopal Diocese of Eastern Michigan on October 21, 2017, serving until 2019.

Education
Waynick attended Central Michigan University from 1966 to 1968. In 1981 she earned a BA in religious studies from Madonna College. She attended St. John Provincial Seminary in Plymouth, Michigan, earning her Master of Divinity degree in 1985. She began work on a Doctor of Ministry degree at the Ecumenical Theological Seminary in Detroit, concentrating on the field of spiritual direction, and was granted an honorary Doctor of Divinity degree in May 1998 from the General Theological Seminary in New York City.

Personal life
Waynick is married to Larry Waynick, a retired elementary school principal. They have two married children.

References

External links
 Official Diocese of Indianapolis website
 Biography on Christ Church Cathedral website
 History of All Saints in Pontiac, Michigan

Episcopal bishops of Indiana
Women Anglican bishops
21st-century Anglican bishops in the United States
Central Michigan University alumni
Madonna University alumni
Living people
People from Indianapolis
1948 births
Episcopal bishops of Eastern Michigan
Episcopal bishops of Indianapolis